Baden v Société Générale pour Favoriser le Developpement du Commerce et de l'Industrie en France [1983] BCLC 325 is an English trusts law case, concerning breach of trust and knowing receipt of trust property.  It was most famous for giving rise to the "Baden scale" or the "Baden knowledge scale" following on from the judgment of Peter Gibson J as to the five different types of relevant knowledge in knowing assistance cases.  The use of the Baden scale has since fallen out of judicial favour in the United Kingdom.

Facts
Mr Georges Baden, Jacques Delvaux and Ernest Lecuit were liquidators of the Luxembourg Mutual Investment Fund (FOF Proprietary Funds Ltd, along with a fund of funds, Venture Fund (International) NV, and IOS Growth Fund Ltd, all mutual 'dollar funds'). They claimed that Société Générale owed it $4,009,697.91, which it held for its customer, the Bahamas Commonwealth Bank Ltd in a trust account. On 10 May 1973, it followed BCB's instructions, in arrangement with Algemene Bank, Amsterdam, transferred the money to Banco Nacional de Panama, to a non-trust account in BCB's name. This, claimed Baden, made Société Générale a constructive trustee, and so had a duty to account. Alternatively, Société Générale was claimed to owe a duty of care, and to be liable in damages for the loss suffered.

Judgment
Peter Gibson J held that Société Générale was not liable because it had no knowledge at the time of the fraud in which it assisted. The relevant knowledge had to be knowledge of the facts. Recklessly refraining to make enquiries that a reasonable banker would have made would be enough. But otherwise a banker had a primary obligation to comply with instructions, save in exceptional circumstances, in which it came under a duty of enquiry.

See also

English trusts law

Notes

References

English trusts case law
High Court of Justice cases
1982 in British law
1982 in case law
Société Générale